Pukara (Aymara and Quechua for fortress, Hispanicized spellings Pucara, Pucará) is a mountain in the Andes of Peru, about  high . It is located in the Arequipa Region, Arequipa Province, Tarucani District. Pukara lies north of Wilani and northeast of Qillqata.

References 

Mountains of Arequipa Region
Mountains of Peru